Tentax musculus is a moth of the family Erebidae first described by Michael Fibiger in 2011. It is found in Brunei.

The wingspan is about 10.5 mm. The head, labial palps, patagia, thorax, tegulae and forewings (including the quadrangular patch, basal costal patch and fringes) are beige and light reddish brown. The abdomen is of a similar colour. The crosslines are beige; except for the brown subterminal and terminal lines. The hindwings are grey with an indistinct discal spot. The underside of the forewings is light brown and the underside of the hindwings is grey with a discal spot.

References

Micronoctuini
Taxa named by Michael Fibiger
Moths described in 2011